Kittikorn Liasirikun (born  1967), also known as Leo Kittikorn, is a Thai film director, screenwriter and producer. His films include Bus Lane and Saving Private Tootsie.

Filmography

Director 
 18-80 Buddy (18-80 Puan si maimee sua) (1997)
 A Miracle of Oam and Somwung (Patihan Om + Somwang) (1998)
 Goal Club (Game Lom To) (2001)
 Saving Private Tootsie (Phrang Chompu) (2002)
 The Mia aka The Bullet Wives (2005)
 Ahimsa: Stop to Run (Ahingsa-Jikko mee gam) (2005)
 Bus Lane (May narok muay yok law) (2007)
 Dream Team (2008)
 Sunset at Chaophraya (Khu Kam) (2013)
Spooks in Thailand (Mun plaiw mak) (2014) (co-directed with other three directors)

Screenwriter 
 Saving Private Tootsie (Phrang Chompu) (2002)
 Necromancer (Jom kha mung wej) (2005) (co-written with Piyapan Choopetch)
 Ahimsa: Stop to Run (Ahingsa-Jikko mee gam) (2005)
 Bus Lane (May narok muay yok law) (2007)
 Rakna 24 Hours (Rakna 24 Chuamohng) (2007) (co-written with Haeman Chatemee)
 Dream Team (2008)

Producer 
 Ahimsa: Stop to Run (Ahingsa-Jikko mee gam) (2005)
 Som and Bank: Bangkok for Sale aka One Take Only (2001)
 Spooks in Thailand (Mun plaiw mak) (2014)

External links

1967 births
Kittikorn Liasirikun
Kittikorn Liasirikun
Living people